Denise Margaret Allen (29 March 1953 – 22 January 2022) was an Australian politician, political strategist, social commentator and disability advocate.

Life and career
Allen was born on 29 March 1953 in Alexandra, Victoria, to Jack Donald Boote and Bette Doreen Boote. She attended Alexandra Primary School and Alexandra High School, receiving her leaving certificate in 1970. Prior to entering politics, Allen was a life skills and motivational tutor. She also owned a modelling agency, beauty therapy studio and retail fashion store.

In 2000, Allen was the Labor Party candidate in the by-election for the seat of Benalla in the Victorian Legislative Assembly, which was being vacated by former deputy premier and state Nationals leader Pat McNamara. On paper, Allen faced daunting odds. Benalla was a staunchly conservative division in rural north-eastern Victoria and had been in National hands for all but nine years since 1920. However, she won a surprise victory by 237 votes over new Nationals' candidate Bill Sykes. She was the first-ever Labor member to win the division. A Buddhist, she was the inaugural chairperson of the Parliamentary Friends of Tibet. In the 2002 state election, she was defeated by Sykes in a rematch, despite the Labor government being re-elected in a landslide. Although Allen led on the primary vote, she was defeated on the third count after the preferences of the Liberal candidate, Andrew Dwyer, flowed overwhelmingly to Sykes, resulting in a 52-48 two-party-preferred percentage of the vote in favour of the Nationals.

Allen died from cancer on 22 January 2022, at the age of 68.

References

1953 births
2022 deaths
21st-century Australian politicians
21st-century Australian women politicians
Australian Labor Party members of the Parliament of Victoria
Members of the Victorian Legislative Assembly
Australian Buddhists
Australian female models
People Power (Australia) politicians
People from Alexandra, Victoria
Women members of the Victorian Legislative Assembly